Tough Guys Don't Dance may refer to:
Tough Guys Don't Dance (novel), 1984 novel by Norman Mailer
Tough Guys Don't Dance (film), 1987 film directed by Norman Mailer, based on his own novel
Tough Guys Don't Dance (Soulsavers album), 2003 debut album from Soulsavers
Tough Guys Don't Dance (High Contrast album), 2007 album by Welsh drum and bass producer High Contrast